Napoleon Beazley (August 5, 1976 – May 28, 2002) was a convicted murderer executed by lethal injection by the State of Texas for the murder of 63-year-old businessman John Luttig in 1994. 

Beazley shot Luttig in the head twice in his garage on April 19, 1994, to steal his Mercedes Benz. Beazley also shot at Luttig's wife, but he missed. She survived the assault by playing dead. Beazley carried out the crime with two accomplices, Cedrick and Donald Coleman, who later testified against him. Both were sentenced to 40 years in prison.

Beazley was 17 years of age at the time of the offense. The victim was the father of United States federal judge J. Michael Luttig. During his appeals to the U.S. Supreme Court, three of the nine justices recused themselves because of their personal ties to Judge Luttig, leaving six justices to review the case. Justice Antonin Scalia recused himself because Luttig had clerked for him, while Justices David Souter and Clarence Thomas recused themselves because Luttig had been involved in their U.S. Senate confirmation to the Supreme Court.

On June 3, 1997, Beazley filed an application for state writ of habeas corpus with the state trial court of conviction. On September 5, 1997, the trial court held an evidentiary hearing. On October 31, 1997, the trial court entered findings of fact and conclusions of law denying habeas relief. On January 21, 1998, the Texas Court of Criminal Appeals accepted the trial court's findings; they turned down relief. On October 1, 1998, Beazley filed a petition for habeas corpus in the U.S. District Court for the Eastern District of Texas, which eventually denied relief. On September 30, 1999, the Supreme Court denied further relief. On October 26, 1999, the district court turned down reconsideration. On December 28, 1999, the U.S. district court allowed Beazley to make an appeal.

On June 1, 2000, Beazley filed his brief on appeal to the United States Court of Appeals for the Fifth Circuit. On February 9, 2001, the Fifth Circuit issued a published opinion asserting the denial of habeas relief. On March 15, 2001, the Fifth Circuit turned down Beazley's petition for rehearing. On March 30, 2001, Beazley's execution was determined to be on Aug. 15, 2001 by the District Court of Smith County, Texas. On June 13, 2001, Beazley petitioned for certiorari review from the denial of federal habeas relief. On June 28, 2001, Beazley applied for a stay of execution from the Supreme Court. On August 13, 2001, the Supreme Court voted 3–3 on Beazley's request for a stay of execution. The tie vote resulted in the Fifth Circuit's decision standing, effectively rejecting Beazley's request for a stay.  On August 15, 2001, the Court of Criminal Appeals granted a stay of execution on the day of Beazley's scheduled execution.

On October 1, 2001, the Supreme Court turned down certiorari review. On April 17, 2002, the Texas Court of Criminal Appeals vacated the stay of execution. On April 26, 2002, Beazley's execution was determined to be on May 28, 2002, by the District Court of Smith County, Texas. On May 7, 2002, Beazley filed a petition for clemency with the Texas Board of Pardons and Paroles. On May 13, 2002, Beazley filed a supplemental petition for clemency. On May 17, 2002, Beazley along with 3 others filed 1983 suit in the U.S. District Court pleading inadequate representation. (That same day, U.S. District Judge Hayden Head declined to hear the lawsuit. A notice of appeal was filed.) On May 21, 2002, the Fifth Circuit administered an opinion asserting the lower court's judgment, turning down injunctive relief. On May 22, 2002, Beazley petitioned for certiorari review to the Supreme Court.

On May 28, 2002, the Supreme Court voted unanimously 6–0 to reject Beazley's request for a writ of habeas corpus.  He was executed by lethal injection that evening.

Beazley's execution sparked a fierce debate between opponents and supporters of the death penalty, particularly with respect to juvenile offenders. Some organizations, such as Amnesty International, argued in favor of clemency due to his age (at the time of the offense Beazley was 3½ months from his 18th birthday) and their opposition to the death penalty in general. Beazley was one of the last juvenile offenders to be executed in the United States.

In 2005, the Supreme Court (in Roper v. Simmons) banned the practice of executing offenders who were under the age of 18 when they committed their crimes.

See also

 Capital punishment for juveniles in the United States
 Capital punishment in Texas
 Capital punishment in the United States
 List of people executed in Texas, 2000–2009
 List of people executed in the United States in 2002
 Roper v. Simmons: 2005 U.S. Supreme Court ruling that the execution of those under 18 (at the time of committing the capital crime) is unconstitutional.
 Thompson v. Oklahoma: 1988 U.S. Supreme Court ruling that the execution of those who committed their crime when under the age of 16 is unconstitutional.

References

External links
Video interviews and their transcripts from the Texas After Violence Project. Two separate interviews with Napoleon Beazley's father, Ireland, and his brother, Jamaal. Retrieved 2010-11-11.
Interview with Jamaal Beazley, Brother of Napoleon Beazley. Human Rights Documentation Initiative and Texas After Violence Project. Retrieved 2010-11-11.
Interview with Ireland Beazley, Father of Napoleon Beazley. Human Rights Documentation Initiative and Texas After Violence Project. Retrieved 2010-11-11.
 (JPG). Texas Department of Criminal Justice. Retrieved 2007-11-11.

1976 births
2002 deaths
1994 murders in the United States
Criminals from Texas
American people executed for murder
21st-century executions by Texas
People executed by Texas by lethal injection
Place of birth missing
People convicted of murder by Texas
Executed African-American people
Juvenile offenders executed by the United States
21st-century executions of American people
People from Grapeland, Texas